The 35th Annual GMA Music Awards (the show had a name change in 2004-05) were held on April 28, 2004 recognizing accomplishments of musicians for the year 2003. The show was held at the Municipal Auditorium in Nashville, Tennessee, and was hosted by Deion Sanders and Yolanda Adams.

Nominations were announced months earlier by Steven Curtis Chapman and Toby McKeehan.

The event was transmitted live to theaters in 50 cities as part of Regal Entertainment Group "One Night Only" event. The livecast was shown at Regal Cinemas, United Artists Theatres, and Edwards Theatres.  There was no delayed television broadcast, as part of a controversial move by broadcast rights holder United Paramount Network, scorned by Sanders for leaving CBS' The NFL Today (UPN owned CBS) in favour of Disney's NFL Countdown in the weeks between the awards ceremony and broadcast date, cancelled the television broadcast.  This move was similar to a 1989 incident on CBS' 60 Minutes when a story on Richard Petty intending to air on the show in the weeks before the Daytona 500 was cancelled following reporter Diane Sawyer's defection to ABC.  (That story was later edited and rewritten with Harry Reasoner the following season.)

The ceremony was eventually broadcast in December 2004 on Pax (now Ion Television).

MercyMe won Artist of the Year, plus two other awards, while Jeremy Camp was awarded New Artist of the Year.

Performers

Telecast ceremony
The following performed:

Presenters

Telecast ceremony
The following presented:

Amy Grant and Vince Gill — introduced video message from Bono
Bono — introduced Jars of Clay
Stephen Baldwin
Derrick Mason
Bethany Hamilton
Kristy Starling
R.J. Helton
LaShell Griffin
Steven Curtis Chapman
TobyMac
Kirk Franklin
Michael W. Smith
Mary Mary
Michelle Williams
Charlie Peacock

Awards

General

Artist of the Year
MercyMe
Michael W. Smith
Randy Travis
Stacie Orrico
Switchfoot

New Artist of the Year
Across the Sky
Casting Crowns
Jeremy Camp
Kristy Starling
Todd Agnew

Group of the Year
Jars of Clay
MercyMe
Newsboys
Switchfoot
Third Day

Male Vocalist of the Year
Bart Millard
David Phelps
Jeremy Camp
Mark Schultz
Steven Curtis Chapman

Female Vocalist of the Year
CeCe Winans
Joy Williams
Nichole Nordeman
Rebecca St. James
Stacie Orrico

Song of the Year
"All About Love" - Steven Curtis Chapman
Steven Curtis Chapman, songwriter
"Everything to Me" - Avalon
 Chad Cates, Sue Smith, songwriters
"Great Light of the World" - Bebo Norman
Bebo Norman, songwriter
"He Reigns" - Newsboys
Peter Furler, Steve Taylor, songwriters
"If We Are the Body" - Casting Crowns
Mark Hall, songwriter
"Lord Have Mercy" - Michael W. Smith
Steve Merkel, songwriter
"Meant to Live" - Switchfoot
Jonathan Foreman, Tim Foreman, songwriter
"Three Wooden Crosses" - Randy Travis
Doug Johnson, Kim Williams, songwriter
"You Are a Child of Mine" - Mark Schultz
Mark Schultz, Chris Eaton, songwriters
"Word of God Speak" - MercyMe
Pete Kipley, Bart Millard, songwriters

Songwriter of the Year
Mark Hall

Producer of the Year
Brown Bannister
Christopher Harris
Marc Byrd
Steve Hindalong
Steven V. Taylor

Pop

Pop/Contemporary Recorded Song of the Year
"(There's Gotta Be) More to Life" - Stacie Orrico
"You Are a Child of Mine" - Mark Schultz
"I Still Believe" - Jeremy Camp
"If We Are the Body" - Casting Crowns
"Word of God Speak" - MercyMe

Pop/Contemporary Album of the Year
All About Love - Steven Curtis Chapman
Casting Crowns - Casting Crowns
Simple Things - Amy Grant
Stacie Orrico - Stacie OrricoStories & Songs - Mark Schultz

Rock

Rock Recorded Song of the Year
"All About You" - Nate Sallie"Ammunition" - Switchfoot"Dirty" - Audio Adrenaline
"Free" - Plumb
"Get This Party Started" - TobyMac

Rock Album of the Year
Believe - Big DismalLose This Life - TaitPhenomenon - Thousand Foot Krutch
Picking Up the Pieces - Seventh Day Slumber
Say It Loud - Sanctus Real

Rock/Contemporary Recorded Song of the Year
"Gone" - Switchfoot"Meant to Live" - Switchfoot"Sing a Song" - Third Day
"This Fragile Breath (The Thunder Song)" - Todd Agnew
"You Are So Good to Me" - Third Day

Rock/Contemporary Album of the Year
Furthermore: From the Studio, From the Stage - Jars of Clay
Grace Like Rain - Todd Agnew
So Much for Substitutes - DownhereThe Beautiful Letdown - SwitchfootWorldwide - Audio Adrenaline

Modern Rock Recorded Song of the Year
"Beautiful Day" - Sanctus Real"Breaking Me Down" - Downhere"Go" - Andy Hunter°
"I Am Understood" - Relient K
"Savior" - Skillet

Modern Rock Album of the Year
2 - Apt.core
A Beautiful Glow - Rock n Roll Worship Circus
Beautiful Lumps of Coal - Plumb
Perfect Change - DakonaTwo Lefts Don't Make a Right...but Three Do - Relient KRap/Hip-Hop

Rap/Hip Hop Recorded Song of the Year"Believe" - GRITS (featuring Jennifer Knapp)"Dear Slim Pt. 2" - KJ-52
"Jubilee" - Souljahz
"Love Is In The House" - TobyMac
"Raised in Harlem" - T-Bone, Michael Tait and Donnie Lewis

Rap/Hip Hop Album of the Year
Gospelalphamegafunkyboogiediscomusic - T-Bone
Holy Culture - The Cross MovementIt's Pronounced Five Two - KJ-52Lil iROCC Williams - Lil iROCC Williams
The Exodus - Gospel Gangstaz

Inspirational
Inspirational Recorded Song of the Year"Everything To Me" - Avalon"Free (Take My Life)" - Jill Paquette
"In the Garden/There Is None Like You (Remix)" - Watermark with Shane & Shane
"Jesus Is" - Jaci Velasquez
"My Hope" - Darlene Zschech & Hillsong

Inspirational Album of the YearAbove It All - The MartinsBecoming - Christine Dente
Forgiveness - Jim Witter
Live...This Is Your House - Brooklyn Tabernacle Choir
Take Hold of Christ - Sandi Patty

Gospel

Southern Gospel Recorded Song of the Year
"Gentle Shepherd" - Gaither Vocal Band
"He Forgets" - Legacy Five"The Cross" - The Crabb Family"The Promise" - The Martins"When the Savior Wipes the Tears From Our Eyes" - The Hoskins Family

Southern Gospel Album of the Year
A Cappella - Gaither Vocal Band
Best of Friends - Joyce Martin McCollough, Karen Peck Gooch, Sheri Easter
Great Day - The Hoppers
Quartets - Greater VisionThe Walk - The Crabb FamilyTraditional Gospel Recorded Song of the Year
"Breakthrough" - The Born Again Church Choir
"Holiness Is Right" - The Born Again Church Choir
"I Need You to Survive" - Hezekiah Walker & The Love Fellowship Choir"Poor Man Lazarus" - Fisk Jubilee Singers"View The City" - Rizen

Traditional Gospel Album of the Year
Ann McCrary - Ann McCrary
Believe - Aaron NevilleCeCe Winans Presents...The Born Again Church Choir - The Born Again Church ChoirRizen - Rizen
Shirley Caesar & Friends - Shirley Caesar

Contemporary Gospel Recorded Song of the Year
"Because of Who You Are" - Vicki Yohe"Hallelujah Praise" - CeCe Winans"I Need More Love" - Robert Randolph & The Family Band
"I Need You Now" - Smokie Norful
"The Presence of the Lord" - Byron Cage

Contemporary Gospel Album of the Year
Donnie McClurkin Again - Donnie McClurkin
Bringing It All Together - Vickie Winans
Byron Cage: Live at New Birth Cathedral - Byron CageI Need You Now: Limited Edition - Smokie NorfulOn the Inside - Alvin Slaughter
Speak Life - Joe Pace & The Colorado Mass Choir

Country & Bluegrass

Country Recorded Song of the Year
"Closer To Home" - Connie Smith, Sharon White, Barbara Fairchild (SW & F)
"Family Man" - Andrew Peterson
"Love Never Fails" - Connie Smith, Sharon White, Barbara Fairchild (SW & F)
"Pray for the Fish" - Randy Travis
"Stand by the River" - Dottie Rambo and Dolly Parton"Three Wooden Crosses" - Randy TravisCountry Album of the Year
Colors - The Oak Ridge Boys
Love Never Fails - Connie Smith, Sharon White, Barbara Fairchild (SW & F)
Refuse To Be Afraid - LordSong
The Christmas Guest - Andy Griffith
The Other Side - Billy Ray CyrusWorship & Faith - Randy TravisBluegrass Recorded Song of the Year
"Love is Free" - George Hamilton IV
"She Found Jesus Alive" - The Hoppers"So Many Years, So Many Blessings" - The Lewis Family"Teach Me To Love Like That" - LordSong
"Walkin Through The Fire" - Connie Smith, Sharon White, Barbara Fairchild (SW & F)

Bluegrass Album of the YearWondrous Love - Blue HighwayPraise & Worship

Worship Song of the Year
"Above All" - Randy Travis
Lenny LeBlanc, Paul Baloche, songwriters
"God of Wonders" - Third Day
Marc Byrd, Steve Hindalong, songwriters
"He Reigns" - Newsboys
Steve Taylor, Peter Furler, songwriters"Here I Am to Worship" - SalvadorTim Hughes, songwriter"Throne Room" - CeCe Winans
CeCe Winans, Andraé Crouch, songwriters

Praise and Worship Album of the Year
Adoration: The Worship Album - Newsboys
Illuminate - David Crowder BandOfferings II: All I Have to Give - Third DayThrone Room - CeCe Winans
Worship Live - Salvador

Urban

Urban Recorded Song of the Year"Dance, Dance, Dance" - Mary Mary"Let Go" - Souljahz
"Love, Peace & Happiness" - Out of Eden
"Nobody Like Jesus" - Darwin Hobbs
"Showpiece" - Out of Eden

Urban Album of the Year
Based on a True Story - Sandtown
Broken - Darwin Hobbs
Free - Virtue
Soul Music - Lisa McClendonUnclassified - Robert Randolph & The Family BandOthers

Instrumental Album of the YearAn Acoustic Christmas - Tom HembyI Can Only Imagine - Fletch Wiley
Irish Christmas - Craig Duncan
Masterpiece - Anthony Burger
The Trumpet Sounds - Rod McGaha

Spanish Language Album of the Year
Amar a Alguien Como Yo - Patty CabreraCon Poder - SalvadorEl Poder Esta En Ti - René González
Exitos de Hoy - Various artists
Trono de Gracia - Don Moen

Special Event Album of the Year!Hero The Rock Opera (Forefront Records)City on a Hill: The Gathering (Essential Records)
Mansion Over The Hilltop (Daywind Records)
Next Door Savior (Creative Trust)
Passion: Sacred Revolution (Sixsteps Records)

Children's Music Album of the Year
Acorns to Oaks - Celeste Clydesdale
Canciones de Gozo Para Ninos - Alejandro Allen and Edgar Arceo
Crazy Praize: Songs From the Lighter Side Vol. 2 - Ed Kee and Dave Hunt
I Can Only Imagine... Lullabies for a Peaceful Rest - Various artistsShout Praises Kids 3 - Jeff SandstromSongtime Kids: All New Praise Songs - Dennis Dearing and Kevin Stokes

Choral Collection of the Year
Extreme! Youth Worship - Steven V. Taylor and Johnathan CrumptonHigh Praises - Phil Barfoot and Lari GossHymns for Praise & Worship - John E. Coates and Travis Cottrell
Inhabit The Praise - Geron Davis, Wayne Haun and Steve Carey
Simply Worship - Rob Howard, David Guthrie and Dale Bleam

Recorded Music Packaging of the Year!Hero The Rock Opera - Various artistsBethany Newman (art director)City on a Hill: The Gathering - Various artists
Robert Beeson, Jordyn Thomas (art directors)
Furthermore: From the Studio, From the Stage - Jars of Clay
Tim Parker (art director)Here in America - Various artists
Rusty Mitchell, Jill Paquette, Scott Hughes, Stephanie McBrayer (art directors)The Agony Scene - The Agony Scene
Don Clark (art director)In Bright Mansions - The Fisk Jubilee Singers
Jim McAnally (art director)

Musicals

Musical of the YearA Thrill of HopeEvidence of GraceThe Love of JesusThe Wonderful Cross

Youth/Children's Musical of the YearAcorns to OaksCity on a Hill ChristmasNoelle, The FirstThe Christmas S.O.C.C.E.R. TeamThe First LeonVideos

Short Form Music Video of the Year
"(There's Gotta Be) More to Life" - Stacie Orrico
"Dear Slim" - KJ-52
"Breathe Slow" - Mars Ill
"Hoy Mas Que Nunca" - Miguel Angel Guerra
"Legacy" - Nichole Nordeman
"You Get Me" - ZOEgirl

Long Form Music Video of the Year#1 Hits Live - The Crabb FamilyAlive - Audio AdrenalineFree At Last: The Movie (10th Anniversary) - dc TalkSteven Curtis Chapman Live - Steven Curtis Chapman'Third Day Live In Concert, The Come Together Tour - Third Day'''

References

External links
Nominations announced for 35th annual Dove Awards
The 35th Annual Dove Awards: Nominees

GMA Music Awards
GMA Dove Awards
2004 in American music
2004 in Tennessee
GMA